The second revised Dwikora Cabinet was the Indonesian cabinet which served under President Sukarno from March 1966 until July 1966. The Cabinet was formed after Lieutenant General Suharto, using the powers that Sukarno gave to him in Supersemar, arrested 15 Ministers from the Revised Dwikora Cabinet suspected of being sympathizers of the Indonesian Communist Party (PKI).

President
President/Prime Minister/Supreme Commander-in-Chief of the Armed Forces/Mandatory of the Provisional People's Consultative Assembly (MPRS)/Great Leader of the Revolution: Sukarno

Office of the President
Deputy Prime Minister for General Affairs: Johannes Leimena
State Secretary: M. Ichsan
Presidential Secretary for Special Affairs: S. Munadjat Danusaputro
Cabinet Secretary: Police Brig. Gen. Hugeng Imam Santoso
Deputy State Secretary and Presidential Secretary: Djamin Ginting

Ministers in the Field of Social and Political Affairs
Deputy Prime Minister for Social and Political Affairs/Minister of Foreign Affairs: Adam Malik
Assistant to the Deputy Prime Minister for Social and Political Affairs: Maj. Gen. Mursyid
Minister of Home Affairs: Maj. Gen. Basuki Rachmat
Minister of Village Community Development: Aminuddin Azis
Minister of Agrarian Affairs: Rudolf Hermanses
Minister of Transmigration: Rear Admiral Sujono Suparto
Minister of Information: W. J. Rumambi
Minister of Education and Culture: Sarino Mangunpranoto
Minister of Primary Education: M. Said
Minister of Higher Education: Mashuri
Minister of Sports: Maladi
Minister of Religious Affairs: Sjaifuddin Zuchri
Minister of Hajj Affairs: Farid Mar'uf
Assistant to the Minister of Religious Affairs for Communications with Ulamas: Marzuki Jatim
Minister of Social Affairs: Muljadi Djojomartono
Minister of Justice/Chief Justice of the Supreme Court: Wirjono Prodjodikoro
Minister of Manpower: Police Col. Awaluddin
Minister of Health: Maj. Gen. Dr. Satrio

Ministers in the Field of Economics, Finance, and Development
Deputy Prime Minister for Economics, Finance, and Development/Minister of Tourism: Hamengkubuwono IX
Assistants to the Deputy Prime Minister for Economics, Finance, and Development: Maj. Gen. Ali Sadikin, Arifin Harahap, J. D. Massie, Brig. Gen. Sukendro, and T. D. Pardede
Minister of Trade: Brig. Gen. Ashari
Deputy Minister of Trade: Col. Abdurachman Prawirakusumah
Minister of Business Cooperation: Brig. Gen. Achmad Tirtosudiro
Minister of Finance: Sumarno
Governor of the Central Bank: Radius Prawiro
Minister of the National Budget: H. Pelawi
Minister of Banking Restructuring and Investments: Brig. Gen. Suhardi
Minister of Public Works and Energy: Sutami
Minister of Electricity and Energy: Brig. Gen. Hartono
Minister of Irrigations: P. C. Harjosudirjo
Minister of Roads Infrastructure: Maj. Gen. Suharto
Minister of Housing and Development: David Gee Cheng
Minister of Mines, Oil, and Natural Gas: Maj. Gen. Ibnu Sutowo
Deputy Minister of Mines: Brig. Gen. R. Pirngadi
Minister of Basic and Light Industries: Brig. Gen. M. Jusuf
Deputy Minister of Light Industries: Rear Admiral Suharnoko Harbani
Minister of Maritime Industries: Mardanus
Minister of Aviation Industries: Air Commodore J. Salatun
Minister of Textile Industries and Handicraft: Hadi Thayeb
Deputy Minister of Textile Industries: Sjafiun
Minister of Agriculture and Plantations: Frans Seda
Deputy Minister of Agriculture: Sukarno
Minister of Forestry: Sudjarwo
Minister of Fisheries: Rear Admiral Hamzah Atmohandojo
Minister of Special Projects: Rear Admiral Makki Perdana Kusumah
Minister of the Development of the Trans-Sumatra Highway: Bratanata
Minister of Transportation: Rear Admiral Jatidjan
Minister of Land Transportation: Brig. Gen. Utojo Utomo
Minister of Sea Transportation: Navy Commodore Susatyo Mardi
Minister of Air Transportation: Partono
Deputy Minister of Post and Telecommunication: Sahala Hamonangan Simatupang

Ministers in the Field of Defense and Security
Deputy Prime Minister for Defense and Security/Commander of the Army: Lt. Gen. Suharto
Commander of the Navy: Rear Admiral Muljadi
Deputy Commander of the Navy: Maj. Gen. (Marine Corps) Hartono
Commander of the Air Force: Air Commodore Rusmin Nurjadin
Chief of  the National Police: Police Gen. Sucipto Judodiharjo
Minister of Veterans' Affairs and Demobilization: Maj. Gen. Sarbini
Attorney General: Brig. Gen. Sugih Arto

Ministers in the Field of Political Institutions
Deputy Prime Minister for Political Institutions/Chairman of the Revolutionary Spirit Development Body: Ruslan Abdulgani
Assistant to the Deputy Prime Minister for Political Institutions: Abdul Fattah Jasin
Secretary General of the National Front/Deputy Speaker of the Mutual Assistance People's Representative Council (DPR-GR): Achmad Sjaichu
Assistants to the Secretary General of the National Front: M. Djambek and Brig. Gen. Djamin Ginting
Chairman of the National Research Agency (BALITBANG): Suhadi Reksowardojo
Chairman of the National Development Planning Bureau (BAPPENAS): Suharto
Chairman of the National Nuclear Research Board (BATAN): G. A. Siwabessy

Minister in the Field of Governing Bodies
Deputy Prime Minister for Governing Bodies/Vice Chairman of the Provisional People's Consultative Assembly (MPRS): Idham Chalid
Chairman of the MPRS/Chairman of the National Resilience Agency: Maj. Gen. Wilujo Puspojudo
Vice Chairman of the MPRS: Ali Sastroamidjojo
Members of the MPRS Advisory Body: Sartono and Sujono Hadinoto
Speaker of the Mutual Cooperation People's Representative Council: Rear Admiral Mursalin
Depurty Speakers of the DPR-GR: Brig. Gen. Syarif Thayeb and Asmara Hadi
Chairman of the State Supervision Body: Maj. Gen. Suprayogi

References

External links
 Indonesian Cabinets Page on Indonesian Embassy in UK

Transition to the New Order
Cabinets of Indonesia
1966 establishments in Indonesia
1966 disestablishments in Indonesia
Cabinets established in 1966
Cabinets disestablished in 1966